The 2007–08 season saw West Ham United compete in the Premier League, where the club finished in 10th place.

Final league table

Squad

Left club during season

Results

Premier League

League Cup

FA Cup

Statistics

Overview

Goalscorers

League position by matchday

Appearances and goals

|-
! colspan=12 style=background:#dcdcdc; text-align:center| Goalkeepers

|-
! colspan=12 style=background:#dcdcdc; text-align:center| Defenders

|-
! colspan=12 style=background:#dcdcdc; text-align:center| Midfielders

|-
! colspan=12 style=background:#dcdcdc; text-align:center| Forwards

|}

References

External links
West Ham United FC official website
West Ham United FC on Soccerbase

West Ham United F.C. seasons
West Ham United
West Ham United
West Ham United